Death and the Dancing Footman is a detective novel by Ngaio Marsh, the eleventh of her Roderick Alleyn books and a classic example of the Country house mystery.  Written in New Zealand, but set in a Dorset (England) country house, it was first published in 1941 (America) and 1942 (Britain), receiving rave reviews from The New York Times, and Britain's The Observer and The Tatler and hailed by the New Zealand Listener as "Miss Marsh's favourite among her own books".

Plot summary
It is 1940. The novel's opening chapter, titled 'The Project', introduces wealthy dilettante Jonathan Royal of Highfold Manor, Cloudyfold, Dorset, gleefully outlining to the poetic dramatist Aubrey Mandrake his plan to host a house party of guests whose mutual animosity is sure to provide a cruelly macabre entertainment. Among them are: an Austrian surgeon; the society woman on whom, twenty years earlier, he performed a disastrous facelift that has disfigured her for life; her two adult sons, bitter rivals in love and for their mother's affections; the fiancée of one brother who still nurtures feelings for the other brother who jilted her; and two equally bitter business rivals in the beauty industry. As Aubrey Mandrake says, Royal has invited stark murder to his home, and the two discuss Pirandello's play Six Characters in Search of an Author which deeply impressed Ngaio Marsh and which she herself later directed with great success. The novel's host and broad plot concept bear a kinship to Agatha Christie's 1936 novel Cards on the Table, although the treatment, characters and specific plot are entirely different and original.

No sooner are the guests unhappily gathered, than Highfold Manor is cut off by a snowstorm with the phone line down (although the house still has electric power, possibly from a private generator). The murderous blow is delivered with a Maori greenstone mere weapon, derived from Marsh's New Zealand nationality and background, and classically typical of the Golden Age Whodunnit's devotion to arcane weaponry.

Inspector Roderick Alleyn is called in, as he and his wife, the painter Agatha Troy, are staying nearby with the Copelands (who featured, two books back, in Overture to Death). Alleyn stages a re-enactment with the suspects, and the killer is, of course, identified. The solution rests around the wireless, and there is an amusingly original feature in a key witness, the footman of the novel's title, who has lingered in the hall to listen to the radio playing and surreptitiously attempt the steps of the novelty dance band hit Hands, Knees and Boomps-a-Daisy.

Adaptations
The BBC made a 90 minute adaptation, starring Nigel Graham and dramatised by Alan Downer, in 1986.

References

Roderick Alleyn novels
1941 British novels
Fiction set in 1940
Novels set in the 1940s
Novels set in Dorset
Collins Crime Club books
Works set in country houses
British detective novels